The Mount Dora Center for the Arts is located at 138 East Fifth Avenue, Mount Dora, Florida. The Center brings art to lives through classes and workshops, gallery exhibits, children's outreach programs, and partnerships with the Art Community. Their annual Art Festival held in February draws more than 200,000 visitors to the City of Mount Dora (pop.15,000) each year. 

History: In 1975, a group of art-loving citizens held the first Mount Dora Arts Festival. It was a small event, but it was a big success. It was decided to have an Arts Festival every year. 

In 1984, many of these same citizens of Mount Dora banded together to form the Mount Dora Cultural Council. It was their goal to celebrate the arts in Mount Dora, as well as further promote and improve the quality of the Arts Festival. Staffed by volunteers and funded through membership dues and private contributions, the Cultural Council began to grow. The following year, the Cultural Council moved into 138 East 5th Avenue. As time went by, more and more people joined the Cultural Council, and in 1986, the Board of Trustees resolved to change the name to Mount Dora Center for the Arts. The Mount Dora Center for the Arts has provided quality art experiences in the Lake County region of Central Florida ever since. 

In 1995, with a 30% down payment and owner-financed mortgage, the MDCA Board of Trustees purchased the building where the Arts Center is currently located.

In 2021 MDCA sold the building and will move into a brand new facility on Royellou Lane in 2022–23.

Art of the Deal is Mount Dora Center for the Arts signature fundraising gala. It is held on New Year's Eve in Donnelly Park under the stars and with the backdrop of a million holiday lights put up by the City of Mount Dora each year. The event features a gourmet meal, premium open bar, silent and live auctions that include fine art as well as international trips. Entertainment is always themed and exciting for guests. At the conclusion guests can walk downtown to watch the city sponsored fireworks.

Art Stroll/Art in the Alley is sponsored by Mount Dora Center for the Arts and is a collaboration with local art studios and galleries. Every 3rd Thursday from 6-8pm, visitors can pick up the monthly map at the MDCA Gallery located at 136 E. 5th Ave Mount Dora, FL 32757. The map shows participating locations and guests walk on a self-guided art tour of local galleries and artist studios. Royellou Lane alley next to the gallery often has hand craft vendors set up to show and sell their work during the monthly event. 

Mount Dora Arts Festival The first Mount Dora Arts Festival was held in 1975. It is a juried event of fine artists and nationally places in the Top 200 consistently by Sunshine Artists Magazine in their annual ranking of Arts and Crafts festivals in the United States.  More than 250 fine artists line the downtown streets under white tents to compete for more than $20,000 in prize money. It is held in the first week of February each year and is free to attend.

The Mount Dora Center for the Arts is an IRS Approved 501C-3 Not for Profit.

References

Art museums and galleries in Florida
Arts centers in Florida
Buildings and structures in Lake County, Florida
Tourist attractions in Lake County, Florida
Mount Dora, Florida